The 2013 I-League 2nd Division is the sixth season of the league under its current title. The season will begin on 9 March 2013. The original 21 clubs who would participate in the 2nd Division were officially announced on 25 January 2013, however since then 5 more clubs were accepted into the league. As a result of the tournament, the winner and the runner-up, Rangdajied United and Mohammedan respectively, were promoted to 2013–14 I-League.

Team overview

Teams and locations

Group stage

Group A
Matches to be played in Singrauli, Madhya Pradesh

Group B
Matches to be played in Indore, Madhya Pradesh

Group C
Matches to be played in Bangalore, Karnataka

Final round

References 

I-League 2nd Division seasons
2
India